Hockey in the United Kingdom may refer to:

 Field hockey in Great Britain
 Ice hockey in the United Kingdom
 Inline hockey in the United Kingdom